Jovan "Cune" Gojković (Serbian Cyrillic: Јован Гојковић Цуне; 7 January 1975 – 22 December 2001) was a Serbian international footballer.

Career
Gojković, nicknamed Cune after the well-known singer, made his first steps playing in his hometown club FK Zadrugar Donja Trepča. He continued his youth career in Čačak, playing for BIP, from where he moved, in summer of 1995, for the biggest city club, the top league FK Borac Čačak. There, he became an important player, having the role of playmaker. In 1996 summer transfer window, he is signed by another top league club, the Belgrade's FK Čukarički. After one season there, his talent was noted by the 1991 World & European Champions, the great Red Star Belgrade. There he achieved his full affirmation as an excellent player, having been specially known as a very effective player in the big matches like the Eternal derby, against rivals FK Partizan, having been the scorer in many occasions. He stayed there three seasons, until 2000, when he signed with the Greek Super League club Iraklis Thessaloniki F.C. It was in the period, while playing for Iraklis, that, in its best playing years, died in a car accident, in the outskirts of Belgrade, while on holiday during the winter break. Since 2009, In his memory, in his homecity Čačak, on the FK BIP stadium, a football tournament "Jovan Gojković – Cune" is intended to be held.

National team
He played one match for the FR Yugoslavia national team, on 23 December 1998, against Israel in Tel Aviv.

References

External sources
 
 

1975 births
2001 deaths
Sportspeople from Čačak
Serbian footballers
Serbia and Montenegro international footballers
FK Borac Čačak players
FK Čukarički players
Red Star Belgrade footballers
Iraklis Thessaloniki F.C. players
Expatriate footballers in Greece
Association football midfielders
Serbia and Montenegro expatriate footballers
Serbia and Montenegro footballers
Serbia and Montenegro expatriate sportspeople in Greece
Road incident deaths in Yugoslavia
Road incident deaths in Serbia